Amata nigrobasalis is a moth of the family Erebidae. It was described by Rothschild in 1910. It is found in Ghana and Uganda.

References

 Natural History Museum Lepidoptera generic names catalog

nigrobasalis
Moths described in 1910
Moths of Africa